Eyelid is part of the eye.

Eyelids (film), a Korean film
"Eyelids", a song by The Dodos from Visiter 2008

See also
Eyelid Movies, album